Marie Katharine Helene Tannæs (1854–1939), was a Norwegian painter known for her landscape paintings.

Biography
Tannæs was born 19 March 1854 in Oslo. She studied with Carl Schøyen, Christian Wexelsen, Christian Krohg, Hans Heyerdahl, Erik Werenskiold, and Pierre Puvis de Chavannes. She attend the Académie Colarossi in Paris from 1888 through 1889.

Tannæs exhibited frequently at the Høstutstillingen. She  exhibited her work at the Palace of Fine Arts at the 1893 World's Columbian Exposition in Chicago, Illinois. Tannæs received an honorable mention at the Exposition Universelle in Paris in 1889, a bronze medal at the 1900 Exposition Universelle in Paris, and a Silver Medal at the Panama–Pacific International Exposition in San Francisco in 1915. 

Tannæs died 20 February 1939 in Copenhagen, Denmark.

Gallery

References 

1854 births 
1939 deaths
Norwegian artists
Norwegian women painters
19th-century Norwegian women artists
20th-century Norwegian women artists
19th-century Norwegian painters
20th-century Norwegian painters
Académie Colarossi alumni
Artists from Oslo